Tu Recuerdo or variants may refer to:

Music
A Tu Recuerdo, 1998 album by Los Yonic's

Songs
Tu Recuerdo (Ilegales song), hit single by Ilegales composed by Vladimir Dotel from On Time 2000
"Tu Recuerdo" (Ricky Martin song), 2006
"Tu Recuerdo y Yo", 2001 song by Lupillo Rivera